Ramgarh Cantonment, usually referred to as Ramgarh Cantt or just Ramgarh is a cantonment town, belonging to the Ramgarh district of the Indian state of Jharkhand. Historically, a subdivision of the larger Hazaribag district, Ramgarh was finally elevated to a district status on 12 September 2007 largely to ease administrative hardships.

A town with a population just short of a million, Ramgarh houses the regimental centers for two of the oldest infantry regiments of India, namely the Punjab Regiment estd. 1761 and the Sikh Regiment estd. 1846. Amongst the most decorated regiments of the erstwhile Raj, the jawans of these two regiments have showcased their valour in several battles including the Afghan wars, the battle of Tofrek, the battle of Abyssynia, the first and the second World Wars and various other post-independence battles.

Ramgarh Cantonment is a Category-I (population exceeding 50,000) cantonment. The cantonment board functions as a civic administration body and is obliged to take care of mandatory duties like provision of public health, water supply, sanitation, primary education, street lighting etc. Thus the scope of the board function extends to the entire gamut of municipal administration. In addition to providing basic amenities, the board also operates various social, cultural and educational institutions for the residents at multiple levels.

Besides the ex-officio and nominated members, the board also comprises locally elected members from multiple wards as per the Cantonments Act, 2006. The term of office for a board member remains five years. The board formally consists of eight elected members, three nominated members from within the military, three ex-officio Members (Station Commander, Garrison Engineer and senior executive Medical Officer) and one representative of the District Magistrate.

Ramgarh is encompassed by the extensively rich mineral fields at Rajrappa, Laiyo, Ghato, Bhurkunda, Topa, Sarubera, Sirka, Urrimari, Sayal, and Gidi. The enthralling vale of Chutupalu connects the town to the state capital Ranchi, about 45 km away. The river Damodar flanks the north of the town.

Geography

Location

Note: The map alongside presents some of the notable locations in the district. All places marked in the map are linked in the larger full screen map.

History 
In Mahajanpada period, Probably the Chotanagpur was under sub-ordination of Mahapadma Nanda. In Maurya period, it is also said that the entire Chhotanagpur was under the subordination of Ashoka. There are symbolic relies of Buddha period in the temple of Gola. Probably in 8th Centre B.C. (3) Jain Trithankar was constructed in Parasnath. In Chapter IV of Gazetteer IV, it is described that Samudragupta (C.385-C-380 A.D.) had invader Eastern Deccan by passing through this area.

Ramgarh Raj was established in 1368 with Urda at Sisia as capital. The founder King of Ramgarh Raj was King Baghdeo Singh. The headquarters of capital was transferred to Badam and  then to Ramgarh.  In 1670 the king Dalel Singh shifted his capital to Ramgarh and named it after his father Ram Singh and Ramgarh Raj name was used by royal family henceforth.

It is mentioned in District Gazetteer, Hazaribagh, Chapter IV, Page no.- 69 in around 1740, Ramgarh was "Jungle District of Ramgarh". The Power of obtaining a reference from Ramgarh regime was given to East India Company by King Shah Alam II.

According to District Gazetteer, Page no.- 70, in 1771 Captain Comac was made Military Collector of Ramgarh District, whose headquarters was in Chatra. The military district of Ramgarh contains Nagpur, Palamu, Hazaribagh, Chatra, Giridih and Kodarma. At that time the headquarters of Ramgarh Battalion was Hazaribagh, whose commander was a European. It is mentioned in District Gazetteer, Hazaribagh Chapter IV, Page no.- 72.

The great social reformer and the founder of the Brahm Samaj Raja Ram Mohan Roy were in Ramgarh in 1805–06. He went there with Mr. William Digby who was then acting Magistrate and Registrar of Ramgarh. Raja Ram Mohan Roy was the Sheristeder of the Collectorate and lived both at Cahtra and Ramgarh in this capacity when Mr. William Digby was transferred else here he took Ram Mohan Roy with him to his new place of work".

In 1811, Ramgarh Battalion was used for suppressing the Munda, Uraon and Tamad Revolt and Kol revolt. In 1837, Ramgarh was a police station of the British government. In 1938 a new G.T. road was started and Banaras road was closed. It is worth mentioning the name of Lubia Manjhi. Bainu Manjhi and Arjun Manjhi. In Sitagarh, the cropping of coffee was taking place. The name of Rupu Manjhi is famous in the first national revolt of 1857.

On 8 January 1856, Sheik Bhikari and Thakur Umraon Singh were hanged on a Bunyan tree of Chhuttupalu valley. This valley is also known as lalki Ghaati and that Bunyan tree is called "Phansiyahi bore". In 1923, Shri K.B. Sahay of Swaraj party was elected for the Provincial Legislative Council of Hazaribagh district (including Ramgarh) (Gazetteer, Page No. 78). During World War II, the Chinese X force was trained at Ramgarh by American instructors at British expense.

Indian National Congress 53rd Session: In 1940 the 53rd Annual Session of the INC was held at Ramgarh under the presidency of Maulana Abul Kalam Azad. At the same time, under the leadership of Netaji Subhash Chandra Bose, a conference against Samjhauta was also held at Ramgarh. Storm and hurricane were on the peak. In Ramgarh, Subhash Chandra Bose was seen as the president of All India Forward Block and M.N. Roy was seen as the leader of the Radical Democratic Party.

Entry to the original place of the INC session is presently not allowed to the public and the place is under the control of the army. The exact location of Bose's session remains controversial.

Ramgarh Cantt council was the early military cantonment structured in 1941.
The history of Cantonment started with the land administration for quartering of troops. Housing was the core objective which attracted the civilian population also to reside in the Cantonment. The Bazaar area was recognized and the Cantonment clearly defined in military, bungalow and civil area.

During the 1940s Chinese troops were trained at Ramgarh by an American contingent. A British Prisoner of War camp existed at Ramgarh at that time where several thousand German and Italian prisoners were housed. With the arrival of the Chinese troops, the prisoners were relocated and the infrastructure handed over for training. The first two American officers arrived at Ramgarh on 27 June 1942. The first Chinese troops arrived on 17 July 1942. Initially, the center was meant for the housing, rehabilitation, clothing, medical treatment, re-equipping and training of the Chinese units which withdrew from Burma in May 1942, unable to stop Japanese advances in the Burma campaign, forfeiting the famous Burma Road and most of Northern Burma. However, other Chinese units were brought in soon. The first course of instruction at Ramgarh commenced on 3 August 1942.

On 10 June 1984, Sikh soldiers of the Sikh regimental center at Ramgarh camp in the erstwhile Bihar state rebelled and murdered their commander, Brig. Gen. R.S. Puri. The mutiny was sparked by an army assault the previous week on the holiest shrine of the Sikh religion, the Golden Temple in the Punjab city of Amritsar. More than 450 people were killed in the attack ordered by Prime Minister Indira Gandhi. Two other senior officers and a number of soldiers were seriously wounded in heavy shooting at the camp that began before noon and continued until 4 p.m. The soldiers joined other angry Sikhs in hijacking private buses and trucks at gunpoint. They set out in at least 35 seized vehicles toward New Delhi before reinforcements from the 24th mountain regiment arrived to stop them. Sikh soldiers remaining behind at the camp raised a white flag of surrender when the reinforcements arrived.

On 12 September 2007, Ramgarh became a new district taking the total count of district in the state to 24.

Demographics 
As per 2011 Census of India, Ramgarh Urban Agglomeration had a total population of 132,441, of which males were 70,871 and females 61,562. Ramgarh Urban Agglomeration is composed of Ramgarh Cantonment (Cantonment Board), Sirka (Census Town), Marar (CT) and Barkakana (CT).

As per 2011 Census of India Ramgarh Cantonment had a total population of 88,781, of which 48,110 were males and 40,671 females. Scheduled Castes numbered 4,382 and Scheduled Tribes numbered 4,283.

 India census, Ramgarh Cantonment had a population of 73,455. Males constitute 57% of the population and females 43%.  Ramgarh Cantonment has an average literacy rate of 68%, higher than the national average of 59.5%: male literacy is 76%, and female literacy is 59%.  In Ramgarh Cantonment, 14% of the population is under 6 years of age.

Literacy
As per 2011 census the total number of literates in Ramgarh UA was 95,734 (82.97 per cent of total population) out of which 55,352 (89.57 percent of males) were males and 40,362 (75.35 percent of females) were females.
	
As per 2011 census the total number of literates in Ramgarh Cantonment was 64,795, out of which 37,578 were males and 27,267 were females.

Civic administration

Police stations
Ramgarh and Women police stations are located at Ramgarh Cantonment.

Headquarters
The headquarters of Ramgarh district, Ramgarh subdivision and Ramgrh CD block are located at Ramgarh Cantonment.

Transport

Railways

Ramgarh Cantonment has four Railway Stations Ramgarh Cantt railway station (RMT)SER, Ranchi Road (RRME)ECR, Argada(ARGD)ECR and Barkakana Junction(BRKA)ECR.

Roadways
Ramgarh Cantonment is connected to state capital Ranchi by Ranchi Hazaribagh Expressway.

Places of interest

Research Centre

Pilgrimage sites 

Rani Sati Dadi Temple: Located near to the Bijulia Lake. This temple is decorated and has antique glass work with Shiv and Bajrang Bali temples too. Various events and programs are organised round the year, and thousands of pilgrims attend them and take blessings. The temple is a replica of the Rani Sati Dadi temple;Jhunjhunu. It is maintained with Mangla path, Bhajans being organized round the year. The temple also has facilities like hall and rooms for organizing some marriage/rituals.
 
Rajrappa Temple: Located at Rajrappa at a distance of 28 km from Ramgarh Cantonment, the site has views of the merging of river Bhairavi and Damodar, near Mata Chhinmastika Temple visited by lakhs of visitors and pilgrims every year.

Mata Vaishno Devi Temple: Situated in the heart of Ramgarh Cantt, the temple, established in 1991 by Punjabi Hindu Biradari, Ramgarh, is visited by various pilgrims from all over India. The Gumbad of the temple is plated with gold.

Tooti Jharna Temple
Situated about 7 km from Ramgarh cantonment on NH-33 (Patna-Ranchi highway), it is a temple devoted to Lord Shiva where the source of water that falls on the Shiv Linga is unknown. The priest of this temple belongs to the nearby village of Digwar, and hence most of the Digwar villagers are connected with this temple.

Maa Vighneshwari Temple
Situated at Madhai Mela Tand (Subash Chowk).

Rudhni Math
Situated in Camp Area (Temple Lane) and also Nag Baba Mandir.

Kila Mandir
Situated in Shivaji Road, in the heart of the town. The soldiers of Ramgarh Battalion had a barricade here, the temple was surrounded and secured by deep canyons filled with water, which was connected to the temple underground now named as Bijulia Talab (lake) which also served as water source for British camp. The Gadh (Kila) of Ramgarh regime was situated nearly 3 km. was on the bank of River Damodar. Famous 'Garh' was signaled from here by the means of Mashal (a source of light). The 'Garh' is still visible from the top of Kila Mandir.

Now Kila Mandir has the Radha Krishna Mandir which is a holy pilgrimage.

Gurudwara Sri Guru Singh Sabha (Gurudwara)
Situated in Shivaji Road, near Subhash Chowk. The Gurudwara is a pilgrimage worshipped by people of all religions, and it is famous for their Seva Bhav.

Jama Masjid
Situated in Chitarpur, 16 km away from Ramgarh, this mosque is an example of Mughal art and architecture. It can accommodate up to 5000 people at a time to offer their holy namaz. It is the biggest mosque of its kind in Jharkhand. It is believed that this mosque was built around 1670 on a piece of land donated by the then king of Ramgarh. In its present form this mosque resembles the Jama Masjid of Delhi. The mosque has several engravings on its wall as well as calligraphy.

Kothar Shiv Temple
Situated 3 km. from Ramgarh on NH 23 (Ramgarh – Bokaro Road). It is said that this temple was built during the Gautam Buddhah Period. It has been marked by the Jharkhand Tourism Department and preserved by the Archaeological Survey of India.

Banjari Mandir (बंजारी मंदिर)
Situated nearly 2 km. from Ramgarh on the Ramgarh – Patratu State Highway. An ancient Shakti Pooja place, established by Banjara Samaj.

Purni Madhai
Situated at Golpar in Ramgarh Town near Bhudwa Mahadev Temple and Rameshwar Math.

Historic monuments 

Mahatama Gandhi Samadhi Sathal: 
This place, popularly known as "Gandhi Ghat", is situated on the bank of river Damodar in Ramgarh. Mahatma Gandhi had visited Ramgarh during the year 1940 at the time of congress session at Ramgarh. After the assassination of Mahatma Gandhi in 1948, pitchers containing the remains of the departed soul were dispatched to different places in the country, including Ramgarh. A Samadhi of Gandhiji was erected to house the same. A fair used to be organized here on the occasion of the birthday and anniversary of Bapu, but this practice has been discontinued. The Samadhi is made of black granite stones.

Fasiyahi Barh [फँसियाही बर (बर मतलब बरगद)]
Situated nearly 7 km from Ramgarh (Ramgarh Chuttupalu Ghati) on NH 33. Shaheed Umraon Singh and Shekh Bhikhari, well known Freedom Fighters of Jharkhand, were hanged at this place by the British in the year 1857.

Phansi Ghar
Situated in Maran Garah, Giddi. It is the place where the British Empire used to execute people by hanging. It is situated in the bank of River Damodar.

Rajendra Park Situated at Jhanda Chowk in the heart of Ramgarh Town where All India Congress Adhiveshan was organized by Congress Party on 19 March 1941. Leaders of Congress including Mahatma Gandhi, Abdul Kalam Azad and Rajendra Pasad took part in this session. The erstwhile King of Ramgarh is said to have played an instrumental role in organising this session.

Nature tourism 

Cheerful Chutupallu ''(प्राकृतिक सुंदरता चुटूपालु का..)
Situated at about 10 km from Ramgarh on the Ramgarh Ranchi NH-33 is a hill top with scenery. The height is 2,930 ft. over sea level. There are many dhabas and motels in the way after crossing Chutupallu. Environmental activist from Chutupalu Mr.Vinay Mehta has taken initiative for reducing carbon footprint to promote low emission development in chutupallu ghati and going to open Nature School (J-D Prakriti School) in the Chutupallu shortly. Gandhaunia, (Hindi: गंधौनिया (गरम पानी कुंड))Situated at about 20 km. near Mandu. It is a hot water spring.Barso PaaniSituated at about 30 km. from Ramgarh near Charhi towards Hazaribagh. Water falls from the ceiling giving the feeling of rainfall in a cave when someone claps.Liril FallSituated 6 km. from Ramgarh on the NH 33 NH-33 looks like the fall from the old Liril Soap advertisement. It is popularly known as Liril Fall. Picnics are common here.Birsa Munda Zoological GardenSituated between Ranchi and Ramgarh at about 35 to 40 km. A large zoological garden.Lugu Pahar(Hills)Situated nearly 20 km. from Ramgarh. Nearest railway station is Daniya, besides Gomia, a famous Indian explosive factory.Brigadier Puri Park'''
Brigadier Puri Park is situated on NH 33 at Bijulia in the heart of Ramgarh Town. A statue of Late Brigadier Puri is situated in park. On 10 June 1984, Sikh soldiers stationed at Ramgarh mutinied. The Commandant of the Sikh Regimental Centre in Ramgarh, Brig S.C. Puri, and his two deputies, Col Jagdev Singh and Col H.S. Cheema, were attacked. While Brigadier Puri died, his two deputies were injured.

Schools in Ramgarh Cantt. 
 D. A. V. Public School, N. T. S. Barkakana
 Agrasen D. A. V. Public School, http://agrasendav.in, Bharech Nagar, Sandi.
 Shri Guru Nanak Senior Secondary School, on NH-33, near Block Office.
 Army Public School, located alongside the Ramgarh-Bhurkunda Road.
 Radha Gobind Public School, near Ramgarh College, Jara Tola.
 Shri Krishna Vidhya Mandir, Vikas Nagar, near Gaushala, AT & PO – Ramgarh Cantt.
 Sidhartha Public School, near Block Office.
 Gandhi Memorial High School, Lohar Tola, near old bus stand.
 St Ann's School, Kaitha, Gola Road.
 Delhi Public School
 K.G.T. School, near Block Office.
 Islamic Academy, Saudagar Mohalla, Ramgarh Cantt.
 Madarsa Anjuman Muslemin Khademin, Saudagar Mohalla, Ramgarh Cantt.
 Maulana Azad Public School(MAPS), Chaingada, Ramgarh.
 Darsgaah-e-Islaami, Chitarpur, Ramgarh.
 Sainik School, PRC.
 Public High School, Kuju.
 Bal Vidya Mandir, Ara Colliery P.O. Sarubera (Kuju) Distt-Ramgarh Jharkhand, 
 D.A.V. Public School, Ara 
 D. A. V. Public School	Tapin North (R R W) P.O. Tapin 
 D. A. V. Public School	Rajrappa Project 
 D. A. V. Public School	Urimari Sayal Po Sayal 
 D. A. V. Public School	Kedla Ccl P O Kedla
 Dav Public School	P.O.-Gidi-A, Ccl, Argada Area., Argada Area 
 Holy Cross School	Ghatotand West Bokaro Jharkhand, Ghatotand
 Kendriya Vidyalaya	Ramgarh Cantt Po Ramgarh. Situated inside Military Cantt
 Kendriya Vidyalaya	Bhurkunda Po Bhurkhunda 
 Kendriya Vidyalaya	Patratu Po Diesel Colony Patratu 
 Kendriya Vidyalaya	Barkakana 
 O P Jindal School	P O Balkudra, Patratu, 
 Patratu School of Economics	P.O. Patratu Thermal Power Station 
 Saraswati Shishu Vidya Mandir- P.O. Sarubera 
 Saraswati Vidya Mandir-Rapappa Project Po Rajrappa 
 Saraswati Vidya Mandir-At Sirka G M Office Post Argada
 Ramprasad Chandra Bhan Public School, Bazar Samiti, Ramgarh
 D. A. V. Public School, Topa
Sri Agrasen Senior Secondary School, Patel Nagar, Bhurkunda, Ramgarh
 St Xavier's School
S N High School, Barkakana
Desh Bandhu Shiksha Niketan, Bazar tand

Colleges in Ramgarh Cantt. 
 Ramgarh College, Ramgarh Cantt.
 ChotaNagpur College, Ramnagar
 Ramgarh Women's College, Ramgarh cantt
 Ramgarh Inter Women's College, Ramgarh cantt
 Radha Govind Teacher Training College, Ramgarh cantt

Health care facilities. 

Medanta Hospital is located 27 km from Ramgarh. The hospital is associated with the Medanta Hospitals group for day-to-day management.
Brindavan Hospital is another nursing home in the locality of Ranchi Road.

Pantanjali Chikitsalaya in Triputi Balji Complex in Bijuliya and Patanjali Ayogya Kendra in Gola Road are the home of Best Ayurvedics from Patanjali Trust.

Hope Hospital is located on Ranchi Road.

Industry 

Ramgarh is one of the prominent industrial hubs of Jharkhand. Numerous small, medium and large scale industries are located here owing to the proximity to mineral resources. SAIL-IFICO's refactory unit is here, Central Coalfields have projects in Ramgarh, Barkakana, Rajrappa, Topa, Bhurkunda, Kuju,etc. Apart from that Burnpur Cements, PTPS, NTPC Patratu, DVC and Karanpura Energy Ltd are government firms have presence here.

Private players like Mukand.Ltd, Jindal Steel and Power, Inland Power. Ltd, Indo Asahi Glass, Brahmaputra Metallics.Ltd, Jharkhand Ispat, Eastern India Powertech.Ltd (DLF Power), Aloke Steel Industries, Maa Chinnamastika Cement & Steel, Chintpurni Steel, etc. are available here.

It is also known for its clothing market.

References

External links 

Ramgarh district

Cantonments of India
Cantonments of British India
Cities and towns in Ramgarh district